Tales from Moominvalley (literally 'The Invisible Child and other stories') is the seventh book in the Moomins series by Finnish author Tove Jansson. Unlike all the other books, which were novels, it is a collection of short stories, the longest book in the series. It was first published in 1962 (second edition 1998). The book forms the basis of episodes 9, 10, 13, 24, and 36 of the 1990 series.

The book contains nine stories:
 The Spring Tune
 A Tale of Horror
 The Fillyjonk Who Believed in Disasters
 The Last Dragon in the World
 The Hemulen Who Loved Silence
 The Invisible Child
 The Secret of the Hattifatteners
 Cedric (Cedric)
 The Fir Tree

External links
 The Moomin Trove

Moomin books
1962 short story collections
Finnish short story collections
Fantasy short story collections
Children's short story collections
1962 children's books